Library East (now known as Smathers Library) is a historic library in Gainesville, Florida, United States. It is located in the northeastern section of the University of Florida in the middle of the Campus Historic District. When it was first created it was the largest building on campus at that time. It is a part of the George A. Smathers Libraries system and home to multiple collections of books and other library materials.

History
This facility was designed by the architect William A. Edwards and was first opened in October 1926. A major addition was designed by Florida Board of Control Architect Guy Fulton following World War II. On June 27, 1979, it was added to the U.S. National Register of Historic Places.  In 1991 after a generous donation by the former United States Senator George Smathers the facility was officially renamed the Smathers Library.

Map & Imagery Library
The Map & Imagery Library makes up a portion of the ground floor of the Smathers Library. It consists of several different collections which, combined, contain roughly 500,000 maps, 300,000 aerial photographs and satellite images, 8,000 atlases and reference books and an increasing number of geospatial datasets. It is one of largest academic map libraries in the United States. It specializes in content concerning Florida, Latin America, the Middle East and Africa and is open to the public every weekday.

Special Collections Grand Reading Room

The second floor of Smathers Library is home to the Special Collections Grand Reading Room. This space provides the primary source of access to many of the George A. Smathers Libraries' Special Collections materials. As many of the materials within these collections are not available to be checked out or loaned, any person interested in viewing them must do so in the Grand Reading Room, under the supervision of library staff. Collections which can be accessed through the Grand Reading Room include, but are not limited to, the University Archives, the Architecture Archives, the P. K. Yonge Library of Florida History, the Baldwin Library of Historical Children's Literature, the Manuscript Collection, the Popular Culture Collections and the Rare Books Collections.

Judaica Suite 
In January 2014, the Judaica Suite was opened as an annexing group of reading rooms accessed through the Special Collections Grand Reading Room. The alcoves of the Suite hold books from the university's Isser and Rae Price Library of Judaica, including many rare copies. Within the Suite, specific books are grouped together in different alcoves to represent various periods in the history of Jewish literature and culture. The Judaica Suite was designed by world-renowned architect and artist, and University of Florida alumnus, Kenneth Treister.

Latin American and Caribbean Collection
The Latin American and Caribbean Collection makes up the third floor of Smathers Library. This collection was founded in 1951, prompted by growing scholarly interest in Latin America and the Caribbean, and has since grown into one of the University of Florida's premier collections. The collection is housed in a newly renovated space and now consists of approximately 500,000 books, 50,000 microforms, thousands of journal titles and a considerable number of digital resources.  About 70% of these resources are in Spanish, French, and Portuguese. Most of the remaining collection is in English, however, there are also materials in Haitian Creole, Dutch, and indigenous languages. Though the collection covers Caribbean and Latin American areas but focuses on the Caribbean and Brazil.  Primary sources from the Caribbean are also available, ranging from agriculture to revolution. The library also has its own stacks, reading rooms, and reference services making it one of the few libraries left in the US to do so. The collection is open to the public and is usually open six days of the week.

See also
George A. Smathers Libraries
University of Florida
Buildings at the University of Florida
George Smathers
Campus Historic District

References

External links
 Alachua County listings at National Register of Historic Places
 Alachua County listings at Florida's Office of Cultural and Historical Programs
 Virtual tour of University of Florida Campus Historic District at Alachua County's Department of Growth Management
 The University of Florida Historic Campus at UF Facilities Planning & Construction
 George A. Smathers Libraries
 UF Builds: The Architecture of the University of Florida
 Library East
 University of Florida Archives Photograph Collection

1926 establishments in Florida
Buildings at the University of Florida
Guy Fulton buildings
Libraries in Florida
Library buildings completed in 1926
National Register of Historic Places in Gainesville, Florida
University and college buildings on the National Register of Historic Places in Florida
William Augustus Edwards buildings
University and college buildings completed in 1926